"" (German for "Hail to Thee in the Victor's Crown", literally: "Hail to Thee in the Victor's Wreath") was the official national anthem of the German Empire from 1871 to 1918 and royal anthem of Prussia from 1795 to 1918.

Before the foundation of the Empire in 1871, it had been the royal anthem of Prussia since 1795 and remained it after 1871. The melody of the hymn derived from the British anthem "God Save the King". For these reasons, the song failed to become popular within all of Germany. Not only did it fail to win the support of most German nationalists, but it also was never recognized by the southern German states, such as Bavaria or Württemberg. At the near end of World War I, the German Empire was overthrown and "Das Lied der Deutschen" was adopted as the national anthem of its successor, the Weimar Republic.

Lyrics
Heinrich Harries wrote the lyrics in 1790 in honour of King Christian VII of Denmark, and the line "Heil, Kaiser, dir" originally read "Heil, Christian, dir". Schumacher shortened Harries' text and replaced the word Christian with König (king). After the proclamation of the German Empire, the word König was replaced by Kaiser (emperor).

Kaiser Wilhelm in the lyrics originally referred to William I who reigned until 1888. His son, Frederick III, who reigned for only 99 days, was succeeded by Wilhelm II. One of the jokes at the time was that the song's title is changed to "Heil Dir im Sonderzug" ("Hail to Thee in Thy Royal Train"), owing to Wilhelm II's frequent travels.
After the beginning of World War I in 1914, Hugo Kaun set the text of the anthem to new music to remove the similarity to "God Save the King".

Other hymns

"Die Wacht am Rhein" ("The Watch on the Rhine") was also a patriotic hymn so popular that it was often regarded as an unofficial national anthem.

In the Kingdom of Bavaria, the official hymn was "" ("Heil unserm König, Heil!"), also sung to the melody of "God Save the King". Likewise, Liechtenstein has "Oben am jungen Rhein" (1920), sung to the same melody.

The Hawaiian anthem "Hawaiʻi Ponoʻī", composed by the Prussian Kapellmeister Henri Berger, is a variation of the melody.

See also
"My Country, 'Tis of Thee"

Notes

References
Notes

Sources

External links

Historical national anthems
Royal anthems
German anthems
German Empire
German patriotic songs
German-language songs
Cultural depictions of Christian VII of Denmark
National anthem compositions in G major
God Save the King